The following is a list of ecoregions in Chad, according to the Worldwide Fund for Nature (WWF).

Terrestrial ecoregions
By major habitat type:

Tropical and subtropical grasslands, savannas, and shrublands

East Sudanian savanna
Sahelian Acacia savanna

Flooded grasslands and savannas

Lake Chad flooded savanna

Deserts and xeric shrublands

East Saharan montane xeric woodlands
Sahara Desert
South Saharan steppe and woodlands
Tibesti-Jebel Uweinat montane xeric woodlands

Freshwater ecoregions
By bioregion:

Nilo-Sudan

Dry Sahel
Lake Chad catchment

 
Ecoregions
Chad